KBDD (91.9 MHz) is a Christian radio station licensed to Winfield, Kansas, and serving the Wichita metropolitan area. KBDD is owned and operated by Family Worship Center Church, Inc.

History
The station began broadcasting in 2000, and was owned by the American Family Association. It was an affiliate of American Family Radio. In 2004, the station was sold to Family Worship Center Church for $1,150,000.

References

External links

BDD
Radio stations established in 2000
2000 establishments in Kansas